The University of Arkansas School of Law is the law school of the University of Arkansas in Fayetteville, Arkansas, a state university. It has around 445 students enrolled in its Juris Doctor (J.D.) and Master of Law (LL.M) programs and is home to the nation's first LL.M in agricultural and food law program. The School of Law is one of two law schools in the state of Arkansas; the other is the William H. Bowen School of Law (University of Arkansas at Little Rock).

According to the University of Arkansas School of Law's 2013 ABA-required disclosures, 68% of the Class of 2013 had obtained full-time, long-term, JD-required employment nine months after graduation.

History
 

The School of Law was founded in 1924. The founding dean was Julian Waterman, a Dumas, Arkansas native and University of Chicago Law School graduate who led the school through its first 19 years, until his death in 1943.

The School met initially in the bottom floor of Old Main, and was approved by the American Bar Association two years later, in 1926. In 1927, the first class, consisting of ten students, graduated.

Over the next several decades, as the law school grew in size, it moved to larger accommodations. The 1930s saw a move to the Chemistry Building just to the southeast of Old Main, and then into Waterman Hall, the first dedicated law school construction project, in the 1950s. The latter half of the 20th century saw additions added to Waterman Hall to form the Robert A. Leflar Law Center.

In 1947, the law school offered admission to L. Clifford Davis, under conditions that would not allow him to be in any room at the same room as white students, including classrooms, restrooms, and the library. Davis chose to instead to take tuition money from the state to attend Howard University, in Washington, D.C. On February 2, 1948, the University of Arkansas School of Law became the first Southern white university to accept an African-American student since Reconstruction. Silas H. Hunt, a World War II veteran who had been wounded in the Battle of the Bulge and following the conclusion of the war had completed an undergraduate degree in English at Arkansas Agricultural, Mechanical & Normal College applied to multiple law schools in 1947. He chose to seek entry at the Arkansas School of Law to challenge the system of racial segregation established in Arkansas at the time. Accompanied by his attorney, Howard Flowers, Hunt met with the dean of the law school, Robert A. Leflar, who reviewed Hunt's application. Leflar was impressed and accepted Hunt's application to the law school. For a semester, Hunt attended the law school until succumbing to illness, and dying in a veteran's hospital on April 22, 1949, in Springfield, Missouri.

Following Hunt's successful entry into the law school, five more African-American students applied and were accepted into the law school: George Williford Boyce Haley, who went on to become a United States Ambassador to The Gambia; Wiley Branton, who served as dean at the Howard University School of Law; Jackie L. Shropshire; Chris Mercer; and George Howard, Jr., who later became the first black United States district court judge in Arkansas. Collectively they are known as the "Six Pioneers." In June, 1951, Shropshire became the first to graduate. In 1958 Branton argued Cooper v. Aaron in front of the Supreme Court, which forced the integration of Little Rock Central High School. 

Silas H. Hunt Hall, located adjacent to the Robert A. Leflar Law Center, honors Silas Hunt, in addition, to a historical marker in front of the law school.

In 2007, a  addition to the Leflar Law Center was completed, expanding on the Young Law Library, as well as adding a coffee shop, four classrooms, a technologically equipped courtroom, and a formal entrance hall.

Facilities

The University of Arkansas School of Law is self-contained within the Robert A. Leflar Law Center on the campus of the University of Arkansas in Fayetteville, which is located in Washington County in Northwest Arkansas at the edge of the Ozarks.

The law center is a square facility with four wings around a courtyard. In addition to legal library resources, the Young Law Library includes a coffeeshop, computer lab and lounge area.

Legal Clinic
The legal clinic of the law school has been in operation for more than thirty years, offering free legal services to charities, government agencies, and individuals unable to afford legal representation.  The goal of the Legal Clinic, which offers the services of student attorneys, is firstly to train competently students in specific areas of legal practice encountered in every day law practice; and secondly to provide an opportunity for students to refine basic lawyering skills, such as counseling, interviewing and persuasive legal writing.

Clinics 

Advanced Mediation Clinic
Criminal Defense Clinic
Criminal Prosecution Clinic
Civil Clinic
Federal Clinic
General Practice Clinic
Habitat For Humanity Wills Project
Innocence Project
Transactional Clinic
Pro Bono Program
Federal Appellate Litigation Project

The School of Law was the first school in the country to publish a student-edited legal journal devoted to the study of food law and its impact on society, the Journal of Food Law & Policy.

Journals
The School of Law publishes four legal journals.:
The Arkansas Law Review is student-edited and published on a quarterly basis and distributed statewide to members of the Arkansas Bar, as well as legal libraries throughout the nation.
The Arkansas Law Notes, published annually, features written articles and research performed by the faculty of the school.
The Journal of Food Law & Policy is the first student edited legal journal dedicated to food law in the nation and is published twice a year.
The Journal of Islamic Law & Culture is published semi-annually and contains not just articles and reviews on Islamic law, but also presents "an emphasis on the significance in law of the intersection of Western and Muslim legal culture."

Ranking and recognition
The 2013 edition of U.S. News & World Reports "Best Law Schools" ranked the Arkansas School of Law as 68th overall. US News also ranked Arkansas School of Law's legal writing and research 22nd in the country. LawSchool100.com ranked the Arkansas School of Law as 88th overall in its 2010 ranking of law schools. The Arkansas School of Law was also ranked 73rd overall according to the 2010 ranking by the AALS.  The ILRG ranked the Arkansas School of Law 71st overall in its 2009-2010 ranking of law schools. The ILRG also has numerous other categories and ranks the Arkansas School of Law as the 62nd most selective law school, 65th for job placement before graduation, 55th for job placement after 9 months, 77th for best bar passer rates among first time takers, 98th when ranking the school versus the state average for bar passage rates and 72nd for student to faculty ratio. Law & Politics' 2010 ranking of law schools ranked the Arkansas School of Law 139th overall. Leiter's ranking of most desirable law schools lists Arkansas as the 54th most desirable law school in the country. Law.com ranks Arkansas as 100th overall for best job placement and employment trends into "BigLaw". In 2010, The Hylton Rankings place the Arkansas School of Law 86th overall among all law schools. The Arkansas School of Law ranks 65th overall for percentage of class that obtain federal clerkships and 85th for total number of students obtaining federal clerkships. Brian Koppen's Law School Advocacy ranks the Arkansas School of Law as 46th overall. The 2010 National Moot Court rankings place the Arkansas School of Law at 13th overall.

Admissions

The University of Arkansas has LSAT scores that are similar to its peers and GPA ranges that exceed that of its peer schools.   The law school uses an index system to aid in the cutoff process that weights GPA and LSAT to reach a total index number. Applicants below the index will not fare as well as those with index scores above the index cutoff. In 2010 the University of Arkansas school of law admitted 31% of applicants and since 2001 have averaged an acceptance rate of 34%.    Full-time enrollment in the most recent class was 137 students; the school of law only offers a full-time program of study.    The LSAT 75%/25% percentiles and medians were 159, 155, and 158 respectively. The GPA 75%/25% percentiles and medians were 3.73, 3.35, and 3.53 respectively.

Career placement

According to the University of Arkansas School of Law's official 2013 ABA-required disclosures, 68.18% of the Class of 2013 had obtained full-time, long-term, JD-required employment nine months after graduation. The University of Arkansas School of Law's Law School Transparency under-employment score is 15.9%, indicating the percentage of the Class of 2013 unemployed, pursuing an additional degree, or working in a non-professional, short-term, or part-time job nine months after graduation.

The University of Arkansas School of Law places graduates in all nine geographic regions according to the Association for Legal Career Professionals.  The school does place a majority in its home region, West South Central, with 71% of its graduates finding employment in region, and 53 percent of those staying in the West South Central region obtain employment in the state of Arkansas. The most popular states for University of Arkansas School of Law graduates to find employment are in Arkansas, Texas, Missouri, Oklahoma, Georgia, Tennessee, and Mississippi. The table to the right represents regional placement, with percentages, for University of Arkansas School of Law graduates. The University of Arkansas has alumni that practice in all 50 states and the District of Columbia and six foreign nations. The ABA also collects data on placement and puts them into six major categories. They are law firms, business and industry, government, judicial clerkships, academia, and public interest. The University of Arkansas School of Law places a majority of its students into law firms, but significant portions of the class still obtain employment in other fields—business and industry, government, and judicial clerkships. The table to the left represents the fields of placement, with percentages, for the most recent class from the University of Arkansas School of Law.

Prior to the requirement that students complete law school before taking the bar exam, Maud Crawford, who attended UA as an undergraduate for one year from 1911 to 1912, passed the examination first in her class. She became the first woman lawyer in Camden and served from 1940 to 1948 as the first woman on the Camden City Council. Her still-unsolved disappearance on March 2, 1957, became the subject of international concern because she had been a law partner of U.S. Senator John Little McClellan, the former Camden resident who at the time was investigating Mafia infiltration of organized labor.

Costs
The total cost of attendance (indicating the cost of tuition, fees, and living expenses) at the University of Arkansas School of Law for the 2014-2015 academic year is $32,487.70. The Law School Transparency estimated debt-financed cost of attendance for three years is $120,784.

People

Notable faculty
 Carl Edward Bailey, governor of Arkansas 1937–1941
 Bill Clinton and Hillary Clinton both served as faculty at the law school during the 1970s.
 Senator J. William Fulbright also served as a faculty member at the school.
 Robert A. Leflar, legal scholar and judge, taught at the school and served as dean. He admitted the first African-American law student at a southern law school, Silas B. Hunt.
 Mark R. Killenbeck, the Wylie A. Davis Distinguished Professor of Law

Notable alumni
Beryl Anthony Jr. (born 1938), lawyer and politician representing Arkansas's 4th congressional district in the U.S. House of Representatives 1979–1993
Morris S. Arnold (born 1941), professor, historian, and judge of the United States Court of Appeals for the Eighth Circuit
Kristine Baker (born 1971), lawyer and judge the United States District Court for the Eastern District of Arkansas 2012–present
Bob Ballinger (born 1974), lawyer and politician representing part of Northwest Arkansas in the Arkansas House of Representatives 2013–present
Mike Beebe (born 1946), lawyer and politician representing White County in the Arkansas Senate 1983–2003, Attorney General of Arkansas 2003–2007, governor of Arkansas  2007–2015
 Ed Bethune (born 1935), lawyer and politician representing Arkansas's 2nd congressional district in the U.S. House of Representatives 1979–1985
 Will Bond (born 1970), lawyer and politician representing part of Little Rock in the Arkansas House of Representatives and Arkansas Senate 2003–2008, 2017–present
Timothy L. Brooks, lawyer and judge of the United States District Court for the Western District of Arkansas 2014–present
Winston Bryant (born 1938), former secretary of state, lieutenant governor, and attorney general of Arkansas
Erwin Cain (Class of 1988), politician representing Delta, Franklin, Hopkins, Lamar, Red River, and Titus counties in the Texas House of Representatives 2011–2013
Paula Casey, former U.S. Attorney for the Eastern District of Arkansas
Paul Danielson, Associate Justice of the Arkansas Supreme Court 2006–2016
Jay Dickey (born 1939), lawyer and politician representing Arkansas's 4th congressional district in the U.S. House of Representatives 1993–2001
 Clay Ford (Class of 1978), politician representing Pulaski in the Arkansas House of Representatives 1975–1976, and Santa Rosa in the Florida House of Representatives 2007–2013
 Vince Foster,  Deputy White House Counsel 1993
James Hannah  (born 1944), Arkansas Supreme Court Chief Justice 2005–2015 (left early due to health issues); served as Chairman and President, Conference of Chief Justices; nominated by President Barack Obama to Board of Directors of the State Justice Institute 2010–2012; published by Albany Law Review in 2007
Richard C. Harding (Class of 1979), Judge Advocate General for the United States Air Force
Pat Hays, mayor of North Little Rock, Arkansas
Ben C. Henley (1907–1987), chairman of the Arkansas Republican Party 1955–1962
George Howard, Jr. (1924–2007), United States federal judge
Silas Hunt (1922-1949) First black student accepted by the school.
Asa Hutchinson, U.S. representative from Arkansas's 3rd congressional district 1997–2001, and governor of Arkansas 2013–present
Timothy Chad Hutchinson (Class of 1999, born 1974), lawyer and politician representing part of Benton County in the Arkansas House of Representatives 2005–2011
Hayes McClerkin (born 1931), politician representing the Texarkana area in the Arkansas House of Representatives 1961–1970
John Ellis Martineau (Class of 1899), governor of Arkansas 1927–1928; judge of the United States District Court for the Eastern District of Arkansas
Chris Mercer, the first African-American deputy state prosecutor in the South, one of the "six pioneers" who integrated the University of Arkansas Law School.
John D. Raffaelli, American lobbyist
Lee Seamster, Chief Justice of the Arkansas Supreme Court 1955–1956
Mark Stodola, Mayor of Little Rock 2007–present
Boyd Anderson Tackett, politician representing Arkansas's 4th congressional district in the U.S. House of Representatives 1949–1953
Tom Jefferson Terral (Class of 1910), governor of Arkansas 1925–1927
David Whitaker, politician representing the Fayetteville area in the Arkansas House of Representatives 2013–present
Marshall Wright, lawyer and politician representing St. Francis, Woodruff, Lee, and Monroe counties in the Arkansas House of Representatives 2011–present
Susan Webber Wright (born 1948), United States District Judge

References

External links
Official website

University of Arkansas
Law schools in Arkansas
1924 establishments in Arkansas
Educational institutions established in 1924